Longtown may refer to several places:

in the United Kingdom:
 Longtown, Cumbria, an English town near the Scottish border
 Longtown, Herefordshire, an English linear village and parish
 Longtown, County Antrim, a townland in County Antrim, Northern Ireland

in the United States:
 Longtown, Missouri, a village in Perry County, Missouri
 Longtown, Mississippi, an unincorporated community in Panola County, Mississippi
 Longtown, Ohio, an unincorporated community in Darke County, Ohio
 Longtown, Oklahoma, a census-designated community in Pittsburg County, Oklahoma
 Longtown, South Carolina, an unincorporated community in Fairfield County, South Carolina

See also
 Longton (disambiguation)